Robert Nelson Walsh (October 6, 1864 – December 31, 1938) was a Canadian politician.

Born in Huntingdon, Canada East, Walsh was educated at the Huntingdon Academy and McGill University. A veterinary surgeon, he was for twelve years a Town Councillor in Huntingdon and Mayor for six years. He has been Warden of the county and served on the School Board. He was elected to the House of Commons of Canada in the 1904 federal election for the Quebec riding of Huntingdon after being defeated in the 1900 election. A Conservative, he was defeated in 1908 and again in 1911.

References
 The Canadian Parliament; biographical sketches and photo-engravures of the senators and members of the House of Commons of Canada. Being the tenth Parliament, elected November 3, 1904

External links
 

1864 births
1938 deaths
Conservative Party of Canada (1867–1942) MPs
Mayors of places in Quebec
McGill University alumni
Members of the House of Commons of Canada from Quebec
People from Montérégie
Anglophone Quebec people